Getas (Ancient Greek: Γέτας) was a king of the Edoni Thracians.

References

See also 
List of Thracian tribes

Thracian kings
5th-century BC rulers
6th-century BC rulers